This is the discography of the American musical drama television series Nashville (2012-2018) by Academy Award-winning screenwriter Callie Khouri and starring Connie Britton as "Rayna Jaymes" and Hayden Panettiere as "Juliette Barnes." The drama depicts an inter-related group of vocalists, songwriters, and music industry members who live in Nashville, Tennessee. All of the actors who portray singing characters perform their own vocals in the series.

In addition to Britton and Panettiere, other cast members who perform songs in the series include: Clare Bowen as "Scarlett O'Connor," Sam Palladio as "Gunnar Scott," Jonathan Jackson as "Avery Barkley," Charles Esten as "Deacon Claybourne," real-life sisters Lennon and Maisy Stella as "Maddie Conrad" and "Daphne Conrad," Chris Carmack as "Will Lexington," Will Chase as "Luke Wheeler," and Aubrey Peeples as "Layla Grant." Many recurring or guest cast members also provide vocals.

The Nashville music track lists performers under a group listing of "Nashville Cast", with the actors performing vocals co-listed with "Nashville Cast" on the track listing. Some songs are performed by multiple actors (i.e., "Love Like Mine", "Telescope") and are differentiated by which actor performs on the track. Additionally, there are versions designated as radio mixes, Alternate Versions, and Acoustic Versions for some songs. There is one song, "Fame," sung by Hayden Panettiere, which did not appear in an episode, or on an album, but was aired during The Oscars as a full-length music video to promote the show and then later released as a digital download. Similarly, none of the songs which are heard on the album Christmas with Nashville appear on the series (with the exception of "Baby, It's Cold Outside" as sung by Connie Britton and Will Chase).

For the first season, "Midas touch" producer T-Bone Burnett, Khouri's husband, was Executive Music Producer and shared scoring duties with Keefus Green. Burnett was heavily involved in the production of songs for the show.

Starting with the second season, Executive Music Producer duties were performed by singer-songwriter Buddy Miller, who assisted Burnett during the first season. W. G. Snuffy Walden took over the duties of episodic scoring, with additional music by A. Patrick Rose; the two composers share "music by" credit from "They Don't Make 'Em Like My Daddy Anymore" onwards, with Will Walden providing additional music beginning with "She's Got You."

Unique to the show is the music supervision and curation that connects the TV show with the authentic, rich singer-songwriter country music community, which is localized in Nashville where the show is shot.

Albums

Soundtrack albums

Extended plays

Singles and songs

Season One

Season Two

Season Three

Season Four

Season Five

Season Six

References

External links
 
 
 ABC Music Lounge: Nashville on YouTube

Discography
Discographies of American artists
Film and television discographies
Country music discographies